Landsflug (Air Domestic) was an airline based in Reykjavík, Iceland. It operated domestic passenger services out of its base at Reykjavik Airport.

History 

The airline was established in 2004 and started operations on 1 October 2004, taking over the domestic operations of Islandsflug. The owners of City Star Airlines, a ticket sales office based in Aberdeen, Scotland, acquired the controlling shares of the airline in 2005 in order to acquire JAR OPS 1 licensed operator for its expanding Aberdeen operation. Landsflug had 80 employees (at March 2007). In 2008, the company was disestablished.

Destinations 

Landsflug operated scheduled services to the following destinations: Vestmannaeyjar, Höfn, Sauðárkrókur, Bíldudalur and Gjögur. Landsflug was also contracted by the Icelandic government to operate medical emergency flights.

Accidents 
 31 August 2004, a Dornier 228 belly-landed at Siglufjordur Airport. The aircraft was written off and stored at Reykjavik Airport before being moved to the Flugsafn (Air Museum) in Akureyri in 2010.

Fleet 
As of March 2007 the Landsflug fleet included: 
1 Dornier 328JET
2 Dornier 228-212
3 Dornier 328-100

References

External links 

Landsflug

Defunct airlines of Iceland
Airlines established in 2003
Airlines disestablished in 2008